The House with a Clock in Its Walls is a 1973 juvenile mystery fiction novel written by John Bellairs and illustrated by Edward Gorey. It is the first in the series of twelve novels featuring the fictional American boy Lewis Barnavelt.

Plot
Lewis Barnavelt, recently an orphan, moves to the  town of New Zebedee, Michigan, to live with his mysterious uncle Jonathan Barnavelt. Lewis' uncle turns out to be a mediocre, though well-intentioned, warlock. His next-door neighbor and good friend, Florence Zimmermann, is a far more powerful good witch. Jonathan's house was previously owned by Isaac and Selenna Izard, a sinister couple who had dedicated their lives to black magic, and plotted to bring about the end of the world. Before dying, Isaac constructed the eponymous clock that he hid somewhere inside the walls of the house, where it eternally ticks as it attempts to pull the world into a magical alignment, which would destroy the world.

Lewis befriends a local boy named Tarby Corrigan, who is everything he is not—popular, athletic, thin—but the two soon begin to drift apart. Lewis tries to win Tarby back by demonstrating how to raise the dead in the local cemetery on Halloween but in doing so unwittingly releases Selena Izard from her tomb. An escalating series of encounters with the sorceress' ghost builds to a final confrontation in the basement of Jonathan's house, where Lewis must summon up his courage and prevent the couple from finishing their work and bringing about the end time.

Cronin House

The Cronin House in John Bellairs's hometown of Marshall, Michigan was the inspiration for his book. The house received a historical plaque in 1992. With the film adaptation debuting in 2018, Marshall's population embraced the fame with walking tours and other activities related to the book and its film.

Reception
The House with a Clock in Its Walls received a New York Times outstanding book citation and a Michigan Young Readers award nomination. Anita Silvey wrote in Children's Books and Their Creators that Bellairs "established himself as one of the most compelling mystery writers for children" with The House with a Clock in Its Walls.

Kirkus Reviews wrote that Gorey's drawings of the house were "creepy-cozy", and that "Bellairs doesn't bother to supply either motivation or blueprints for the [...] scheme, but if the cavalier and capricious handling of the occult by characters and author alike precludes any bone-deep shudders, the house lives up to its promise of a few gratifying Halloween shivers". The New York Times wrote: "It's the aura of this story—its blend of the everyday and the supernatural—that makes it glow among a plethora of lacklustre occult books this spring" of 1973. It continued: "What the author has done that's so special is to touch both the intellect and the feelings. He has dusted off the paraphernalia of ancient magic and made us newly aware of the difference between good and evil. His dialogue goes snap, crackle and pop. He sets chilling scenes with suspense that tightens like a screw".

Adaptations
 The book was used as the basis for one of the three segments in the 1979 television anthology Once Upon a Midnight Scary, hosted by Vincent Price.
 The book was adapted into the 2018 film of the same name.

See also

References

External links
 Discussion of the book at www.bellairsia.com
 

1973 American novels
1973 children's books
American children's novels
American fantasy novels adapted into films
American gothic novels
American horror novels
American novels adapted into television shows
Clocks in fiction
Dark fantasy novels
Halloween novels
Novels set in Michigan
Witchcraft in written fiction